Rexroat is an unincorporated community located in Carter County, Oklahoma, United States. The elevation is 1,060 feet.

References

Unincorporated communities in Carter County, Oklahoma
Unincorporated communities in Oklahoma